Gerrit Henri Victor Lodewijk Faulhaber (22 September 1912 – 1951) was an Indonesian football midfielder who played for the Dutch East Indies in the 1938 FIFA World Cup. He also played for Djocoja Djokjakarta.

References

External links
 

People from Cirebon
Indonesian footballers
Indonesia international footballers
Association football midfielders
1938 FIFA World Cup players
1912 births
1951 deaths
Sportspeople from West Java
20th-century Indonesian people